Agrashala ( अग्रशाला in Sanskrit, अगरसाळ in Konkani ) is a pilgrimage resthouse specially meant for devotees in Goan temples. Goan temples are usually seen surrounded by Agrashalas. The Agrashala provides following facilities for the temple patrons or the Mahajanas:
Rest House
Rooms for Mahajanas  (and sometimes other devotees too ) to stay
Food facilities
Wedding Halls ( used for other purposes too )
Sabhagruha ( Convention halls )
Bathing and other facilities
Some are even equipped with kitchens
Some may even have special rooms for the Gurus 
Canteen
Some times can be even used as a Vahan shala

See also
Goan temple
List of Temples in Goa
Vahanas used in Goan temples

References

Konkani
Hindu temples in Goa
Religion in Goa
Hinduism in Goa
Buildings and structures in Goa